This is a list of ambassadors of Singapore to the Japan

See also
Japan–Singapore relations

References

External links
 Embassy of Singapore in Japan

 
Singapore
Japan